John Niebler (born November 4, 1941) is an American politician and attorney who served as a member of the Wisconsin State Assembly from 1972 to 1974.

Early life and education
Niebler was born in Milwaukee, Wisconsin. He graduated from Menomonee Falls High School in Menomonee Falls, Wisconsin. Niebler earned a Bachelor of Arts degree from Marquette University and a Juris Doctor from the University of Wisconsin Law School.

Career 
After graduating from law school, Niebler worked as a legislative intern and Wisconsin Supreme Court clerk. Niebler was elected to the Assembly in 1972. Additionally, he was a member of the Waukesha County, Wisconsin Board of Supervisors from 1966 to 1972. Niebler was defeated by Ronald H. Lingren in 1974. He is a Republican. Since leaving the Assembly, Niebler has worked as an attorney.

Personal life 
Niebler is married and has five children.

References

Politicians from Milwaukee
People from Menomonee Falls, Wisconsin
Republican Party members of the Wisconsin State Assembly
Marquette University alumni
University of Wisconsin Law School alumni
1941 births
Living people